The Nokia X was a mid-tier smartphone announced as part of the Nokia X family in February 2014, running on the Nokia X platform. The device shipped on the same day as the unveiling, with Nokia targeting the product for emerging markets, and was sold and maintained by Microsoft Mobile. On 17 July 2014, Microsoft announced that it would discontinue the line.

The X was previously under development known as Normandy, Project N, the Asha on Linux project and MView.

Unveiling

The phone was unveiled by Stephen Elop at the 2014 Mobile World Congress, Barcelona on 24 February 2014. Contrary to previous leaks, two variants, Nokia X and Nokia X+ were released, with the Nokia X+ having 768 MB of RAM, as opposed to 512 MB of RAM, as well as with a microSD card included in the box.

A third phone, the Nokia XL, was announced, with a larger screen, front-facing camera, rear flash, and longer battery runtime.

Very soon after release, a developer had rooted the device, and enabled the installation of Google's apps and services.

Criticism
The Nokia X was heavily criticized for not having a home button; this was later addressed with the Nokia X2.

Aftermath
In an interview with Forbes, former HMD Global CEO Arto Nummela stated that analysis showed that the Nokia X series became surprisingly popular with users of high end Samsung and Apple smartphone devices, despite the fact that it was a mid to low end device family.

References

External links 
 
 Nokia X range of Android Devices

X
Mobile phones introduced in 2014
Discontinued smartphones
Mobile phones with user-replaceable battery